John Charlton may refer to:

 John Charlton (artist) (1849–1917), English painter and illustrator
 John Charlton (historian) (born 1938), British historian working in the Marxist tradition
 John Charlton (jockey) (1829–1862), English Derby-winning jockey
 John Charlton (MP), Member of Parliament (MP) for Malmesbury
 John A. Charlton (1907–1977), Canadian Member of Parliament (Brant, et al.)
 John M. Charlton (1829–1910), Canadian Member of Parliament (Norfolk North)
 John P. Charlton, American printer and postcard publisher
 John Robert Charlton, arrested in connection with the death of Ingrid Lyne
 John Thompson Charlton (1826–1878), politician in colonial Victoria (Australia)
 Jack Charlton (John Charlton, born 1935), English footballer

See also 
 John Chardon (died 1601), Bishop of Down and Connor
 John Charleton (disambiguation), the name of four Barons Cherleton in the 13th and 14th century
 John Charlton Fisher (1794–1849), Canadian author and journalist
 John Chorlton (1666–1705), English Presbyterian minister and tutor